Wolf Hall Parts One & Two (originally titled Wolf Hall & Bring Up The Bodies) is a two-part play based on Hilary Mantel's novels Wolf Hall and Bring Up the Bodies, adapted for the stage by Mike Poulton. Set in the period from 1500 to 1535, Wolf Hall is a sympathetic fictionalised biography documenting the rapid rise to power of Thomas Cromwell in the court of Henry VIII through to the death of Sir Thomas More.

Production history

Stratford-upon-Avon and West End (2013-14) 
In January 2013, the Royal Shakespeare Company (RSC) announced that it would stage adaptations by Mike Poulton of Wolf Hall and Bring Up the Bodies in its Winter season in the Swan Theatre, Stratford-upon-Avon beginning previews from 11 December 2013, with press performances on 8 January 2014, running until to 29 March. The production transferred to London's Aldwych Theatre from 1 May 2014, for a limited run until 4 October (extended from 6 September due to popular demand).

Broadway (2015) 
Producers Jeffrey Richards and Jerry Frankel brought the London productions of Wolf Hall and Bring Up the Bodies, starring Ben Miles as Thomas Cromwell, Lydia Leonard as Anne Boleyn, Lucy Briers as Katherine of Aragon, and Nathaniel Parker as Henry VIII, to Broadway's Winter Garden Theatre beginning previews from March 20 with an opening night on April 9, 2015, for a 15-week run until July 5. The double-bill was re-titled Wolf Hall Parts One & Two for American audiences. The play was nominated for 8 Tony Awards, including Best Play.

Characters and original cast

Awards and nominations

Original London production

Original Broadway production

See also
Cultural depictions of Henry VIII of England
The Mirror and the Light - 2021 stage adaptation of the final part of Mantel's trilogy, adapted by Mantel and Ben Miles.

References

External links

 

2013 plays
British plays adapted into films
Cultural depictions of Anne Boleyn
Cultural depictions of Henry VIII
Cultural depictions of Mary I of England
Plays based on real people
Plays set in the 16th century
Tony Award-winning plays
Plays about British royalty
Plays set in England